The Cook Islands competed at the 2022 Commonwealth Games at Birmingham, England from 28 July to 8 August 2022. It was the team's twelfth appearance at the Commonwealth Games.

Lawn bowlers Aidan Zittersteijn and Nooroa Mataio were the delegations's flagbearer during the opening ceremony.

Competitors
The following is the list of number of competitors participating at the Games per sport/discipline.

Athletics

One athlete was officially selected on 9 March 2022.

Men
Track and road events

Boxing

Men

Lawn bowls

A squad of ten bowlers was officially selected on 9 March 2022.

Men

Women

Swimming

Four swimmers were officially selected on 9 March 2022.

Men

Women

Mixed

Weightlifting

One weightlifter qualified through their position in the IWF Commonwealth Ranking List (as of 9 March 2022).

Women

References

External links
Cook Islands Sports and National Olympic Committee archive

2022
Nations at the 2022 Commonwealth Games
Commonwealth Games